The Football at the Mangyongdae Prize  is an association football competition held for professional teams in Multi-sport event - Mangyongdae Prize Sports Games in North Korea. The competition is named after the Mangyongdae settlement, where Kim Hyong-jik was from. It is held and overseen by the DPR Korea Football Association and was founded in 2000.

Results

References 

The Chosun Jørn: Can Jørn Andersen Make Sense of North Korean Football?

Football competitions in North Korea